Cédric Ravanel (born 26 November 1978 in Sallanches, Haute-Savoie) is a French former professional mountain biker. He won two silver medals in men's cross-country racing at the 2004 UCI World Championships in Les Gets, and at the second stage of the 2007 UCI World Cup series in Offenburg, Germany. Ravanel also represented his nation France at the 2008 Summer Olympics, and has been training and racing professionally for numerous seasons on Team Lapierre International and GT Skoda Chamonix.

Ravanel qualified for the French squad, along with his teammates Jean-Christophe Péraud and defending Olympic champion Julien Absalon in the men's cross-country race at the 2008 Summer Olympics in Beijing, by receiving one of the nation's three available berths from the French Cycling Association and the Union Cycliste Internationale based on his best performance at the World Championships, World Cup series, and Mountain Biking World Rankings. Ravanel rounded out his team's roster as the third Frenchman to complete a 4.8-km sturdy, treacherous cross-country course, finishing outside the two-hour barrier and picking up a fourteenth spot in 2:01:38.

Career achievements
2004
 2nd French MTB Championships (Cross-country), Montgenèvre (FRA)
  UCI World Championships (Cross-country), Les Gets (FRA)
2006
 2nd French MTB Championships (Cross-country), France
2007 
 2nd French MTB Championships (Cross-country), Montgenèvre (FRA)
  Stage 2, UCI World Cup (Cross-country), Offenburg (GER)
2008
 3rd French MTB Championships (Cross-country), France
 14th Olympic Games (Cross-country), Beijing (CHN)

References

External links
French Olympic Team Profile 

1978 births
Living people
French male cyclists
Cross-country mountain bikers
Cyclists at the 2008 Summer Olympics
Olympic cyclists of France
Sportspeople from Haute-Savoie
Cyclists from Auvergne-Rhône-Alpes